Lily Chloe Ninette Thomson (born 5 April 1989), better known by her stage name Lily James, is an English actress. She studied acting at the Guildhall School of Music and Drama in London and began her career in the British television series Just William (2010). Following her role in the period drama series Downton Abbey (2012–2015), her film breakthrough was the title role in Cinderella (2015).

James went on to portray Countess Natasha Rostova in the television adaptation of War & Peace (2016) and Pamela Anderson in the biographical series Pam & Tommy (2022). The latter earned her an Emmy nomination for Outstanding Lead Actress in a Limited or Anthology Series or Movie in 2022. She has had starring roles in several films, including  Pride and Prejudice and Zombies (2016), Baby Driver (2017), Darkest Hour (2017), The Guernsey Literary and Potato Peel Pie Society (2018), the musical Mamma Mia! Here We Go Again (2018), Yesterday (2019), Rebecca (2020) and The Dig (2021).

Early life
Lily Chloe Ninette Thomson was born on 5 April 1989 in Esher, Surrey, the daughter of Ninette Mantle, an actress, and James "Jamie" Thomson, a musician. She has two brothers, one older and one younger. Her paternal grandmother, Helen Horton, was an American actress. Her maternal grandmother was French, and fled her village near Paris because of the Nazis, later marrying James's grandfather, a minister in the RAF. After finishing her studies at Tring Park School for the Performing Arts in Hertfordshire, James went on to graduate from London's Guildhall School of Music and Drama in 2010. Shortly thereafter, she signed with Tavistock Wood management in London.

Career
Her television credits include Ethel Brown in the 2010 BBC production of Richmal Crompton's Just William, Poppy in the fourth series of ITV's Secret Diary of a Call Girl (2011), and Lady Rose Aldrige in Downton Abbey. Lady Rose became a main character in the fourth and fifth series of the programme. James also appeared as Lady Rose in the series finale.

In 2011, James played Taylor at the Young Vic Theatre in Tanya Ronder's stage adaptation of the novel Vernon God Little directed by Rufus Norris, Nina in Russell Bolam's modern adaptation of The Seagull at Southwark Playhouse, and Desdemona in Daniel Evans' production of Othello at the Crucible Theatre, Sheffield, with Dominic West and Clarke Peters.

In 2012, James played the role of Katrina in Play House and Marijka in Definitely the Bahamas in a double-bill written and directed by Martin Crimp at the Orange Tree Theatre in Richmond, London as part of the theatre's 40th anniversary. Charles Spencer of The Telegraph wrote that "it is performed with a persuasive mixture of mischief and deeper feeling by Obi Abili and Lily James, the latter combining a mixture of neuroticism and glowing sexual allure that proves extraordinarily potent". James played the role of Korrina in the Warner Brothers film Wrath of the Titans and starred in Fast Girls, written by Noel Clarke, centred around a group of young female athletes competing in the World Championships.

James played Cinderella in Kenneth Branagh's 2015 live-action Disney film Cinderella. James was photographed by Annie Leibovitz as Cinderella, in the blue gown her character wears to the ball, for the December 2014 issue of Vogue. James also made her singing debut in the film singing "Sing Sweet Nightingale", "Lavender's Blue" and "A Dream Is a Wish Your Heart Makes" from the 1950 animated film in the end credits.

In 2016, she returned to television in the 2016 BBC historical drama series War & Peace, playing Natasha Rostova. She also starred in her second major film, as Elizabeth Bennet in the action-horror film Pride and Prejudice and Zombies, a parody of Jane Austen's Pride and Prejudice. It received mixed reviews and failed to break even at the box office. James played Juliet in the Garrick Theatre's production of Romeo and Juliet directed by Rob Ashford and the actor-director Kenneth Branagh in 2016.

In 2017, she appeared in several major films. She played Debora, the love interest of the main character, Baby, in Edgar Wright's action film Baby Driver. She played Elizabeth Layton, a secretary to the British prime minister Winston Churchill (played by Gary Oldman), in Joe Wright's war drama film Darkest Hour. She also headlined the Second World War drama film The Exception, playing a British agent posing as a servant to the exiled Kaiser Wilhelm II.

James starred as the younger version of Meryl Streep's character, Donna Sheridan, in the sequel to Mamma Mia!, titled Mamma Mia! Here We Go Again. The film was released in July 2018. In the same year, James played the author Juliet Ashton in the 1940s period drama The Guernsey Literary and Potato Peel Pie Society who exchanges letters with the residents of Guernsey, an island off the coast of Normandy that was German-occupied during the Second World War.

In 2019, James starred as Eve Harrington in Ivo van Hove's stage adaptation of All About Eve alongside Gillian Anderson. The play opened on 15 February to positive reviews, running at the Noël Coward Theatre in the West End until 11 May.

In 2020, James played the second Mrs de Winter in an adaptation of Daphne du Maurier's Gothic romance Rebecca directed by Ben Wheatley and co-starring Armie Hammer. In 2021, she played Peggy Piggott in The Dig, a British film directed by Simon Stone, based on the 2007 novel of the same name by John Preston. In late 2020, she was cast to play Pamela Anderson in the miniseries Pam & Tommy for Hulu. 

In September 2022, it was announced that James was contracted to be a brand ambassador for the Natural Diamond Council, which promotes naturally sourced diamonds.

Personal life
James' father, James Thomson, died from cancer in 2008. She took her father's first name as her stage name when she learned there was already an actress named Lily Thomson.

She was in a relationship with the former Dr Who actor, Matt Smith, whom she met while working on Pride and Prejudice and Zombies, from 2014 to 2019.

In 2021, James began dating American musician and songwriter Michael Shuman, a member of U.S. rock band, Queens of the Stone Age.  In February 2023 it was reported the couple's relationship had ended.

Acting credits

Film

Television

Theatre

Awards and nominations

See also
 List of British actors

References

Further reading

External links

 
 

1989 births
21st-century English actresses
Actresses from Surrey
Alumni of the Guildhall School of Music and Drama
English film actresses
English people of American descent
English people of French descent
English stage actresses
English television actresses
English voice actresses
Living people
People educated at Tring Park School for the Performing Arts
People from Esher